Latvia participated at the 2018 Summer Youth Olympics in Buenos Aires, Argentina from 6 October to 18 October 2018.

Athletics

Basketball

Latvia qualified a boys' team based on the U18 3x3 National Federation Ranking.

 Boys' tournament - 1 team of 4 athletes

Dunk contest

Cycling

Latvia qualified a mixed BMX racing team based on its ranking in the Youth Olympic Games BMX Junior Nation Rankings. They also qualified one athlete in BMX freestyle based on its performance at the 2018 Urban Cycling World Championship.

 Mixed BMX racing team - 1 team of 2 athletes
 Mixed BMX freestyle - 1 boy

Dancesport

Latvia qualified one dancer based on its performance at the 2018 World Youth Breaking Championship.

 B-Girls - Anastasia

Gymnastics

Artistic
Latvia qualified one gymnast based on its performance at the 2018 European Junior Championship.

 Boys' artistic individual all-around - 1 quota

Multidiscipline

Shooting

 Boys' 10m Air Pistol - 1 quota

Individual

Team

References

2018 in Latvian sport
Nations at the 2018 Summer Youth Olympics
Latvia at the Youth Olympics